Poor Old Bill is a 1931 British comedy film directed by Monty Banks and starring Leslie Fuller, Iris Ashley and Syd Courtenay. It marked the film debut of a very young Peter Lawford, playing the child of the main character, Bill (Leslie Fuller).

Premise 
A man sponges off an old comrade from the First World War who believes he has saved his life during the war, although this ultimately proves not to be true.

Cast 
 Leslie Fuller as Bill
 Iris Ashley as Emily
 Syd Courtenay as Harry
 Peter Lawford as Horace
 Hal Gordon as Jack
 Robert Brooks Turner as Mick
 Dick Francis as  Constable

Critical reception
TV Guide gave the film one out of four stars, calling it an "Interesting conception for a farce," but concluded that, "Unfortunately, the idea is carried on much too long, stretching what little material there is."

References

Bibliography 
 Sutton, David R. A chorus of raspberries: British film comedy 1929–1939. University of Exeter Press, 2000.

External links 
 

1931 films
1931 comedy films
Films shot at British International Pictures Studios
1930s English-language films
Films directed by Monty Banks
British comedy films
British black-and-white films
1930s British films